The Coca-Cola polar bears are fictional polar bears used as mascots by the Coca-Cola Company.

History 
The Coca-Cola Company first used a polar bear in a 1922 French advertisement depicting a bear squirting Coca-Cola into the mouth of a thirsty anthropomorphized sun. However, the use of the characters was sporadic until 1993. That year, the Coca-Cola polar bears appeared in an animated film called Northern Lights where they gathered to drink Coca-Cola and watch the Aurora Borealis, which was successful with consumers. The use of polar bears in the 1993 ad campaign was, according to creator Ken Stewart, inspired by his labrador retriever dog which resembled a polar bear. The polar bear has since become "one of the most popular symbols of Coca-Cola." Following the success of Northern Lights, the Coca-Cola Company has produced many more commercials and films with anthropomorphic polar bears, as well as products such as tumblers and plush bears.

In 1995, the Coca-Cola Company won an injunction against the Polar Corporation, a family-run soft-drink company, for running an advertisement in which a polar bear threw away a can of Coca-Cola. The court ruled that the Polar Corporation could continue to use the polar bear character, but that it could not show it throwing away Coca-Cola.

In 2012, the Coca-Cola Company created a live advertising campaign that had polar bears react to the Super Bowl, which was described as "a brilliant marketing move".

Controversy 
In 2011, the Coca-Cola Company pledged to donate two-million U.S. dollars to the World Wildlife Fund to protect polar bears, but has been criticized for giving such a relatively small amount of money compared to their advertising budget and profits.

In 2011, the company changed its drink cans from red to white with images of polar bears for the Holiday season, but consumers protested the change. The Coca-Cola Company reverted the change after one month.

See also 
 Cola wars
 The Polar Bears
 The Real Bears

References 

Fictional polar bears
Corporate mascots
Promotional campaigns by Coca-Cola
Mascots introduced in 1993